Heale Peak is a rock peak,  high, at the east side of Starshot Glacier,  north of Adams Peak in the Surveyors Range of Antarctica. It was named by the New Zealand Geological Survey Antarctic Expedition (1960–61) for Theophilus Heale of New Zealand, an early exponent of the use of triangulation in survey (1868), and later Inspector of Survey for New Zealand.

References

Mountains of the Ross Dependency
Shackleton Coast